"Ain't Nobody Better" is a song by American house/techno group Inner City. The single was the third consecutive number-one on the Billboard dance chart in the US. It also made it into the top 10 in the United Kingdom, Finland and Switzerland. However, the single failed to place on the soul singles chart and on the Billboard Hot 100 chart.

Critical reception
Pan-European magazine Music & Media complimented the song as "cool, funky and irresistible dance music. Already doing well in the UK and a good bet for a major European hit." Jerry Smith from Music Week wrote, "Techno genius Kevin Saunderson is back to see if he can make it three in a row after his massive success with the stunning dance hits "Big Fun" and "Good Life". With characteristic mesmerising synths and clinical beats beneath Paris Grey's vocal, he can't really fail."

Charts

Weekly charts

Year-end charts

References

1989 singles
Inner City (band) songs
1989 songs
Songs written by Kevin Saunderson
Songs written by Paris Grey